Liam Sanford (born 14 March 1996) is an English field hockey player who plays as a defender for Old Georgians and the England and Great Britain national teams.

Club career
Sanford plays club hockey in the Men's England Hockey League Premier Division for Old Georgians
He has also played for Reading & Team Bath Buccaneers. He also plays hockey for the RAF and began playing hockey for Wycombe Hockey Club.

International career
Sanford became the first-ever current Team Bath Buccaneers men's player to represent England Hockey at senior level when he helped his country to a 5–2 win over South Africa in Cape Town.

References

External links

1996 births
Living people
English male field hockey players
Male field hockey defenders
Male field hockey midfielders
Field hockey players at the 2018 Commonwealth Games
2018 Men's Hockey World Cup players
Commonwealth Games medallists in field hockey
Commonwealth Games bronze medallists for England
Reading Hockey Club players
Men's England Hockey League players
Team Bath Buccaneers Hockey Club players
Field hockey players at the 2020 Summer Olympics
Olympic field hockey players of Great Britain
People from Wegberg
Sportspeople from Cologne (region)
2023 Men's FIH Hockey World Cup players
Medallists at the 2018 Commonwealth Games